The Defence and Internal Security Volunteer Reservists Medal is a civil and military service medal of France. Established on 1 July 2019, it replaces the Medal for voluntary military service.

Establishment
Created by Decree No. 2019-688 of 1 July 2019, the Defence and Internal Security Volunteer Reservists Medal is awarded for loyalty and  commitment to service performed in the military operational reserve, National Police reserve, the Defense and security citizen reserve, and the National Police citizen reserve. The medal may also be awarded to people working for the benefit of reservists or to those who promote the mission of the volunteer reservists.

This medal was created to replace the Medal for voluntary military service. Recipients of the Medal for voluntary military service may continue to wear it. Individuals may not wear it if they have been awarded the Defence and Internal Security Volunteer Reservists Medal in a higher grade as the medals are seen as being the same.

Award criteria
The medal is awarded in three different grades bronze, silver, and gold. Each grade has different criteria:
Bronze is awarded for three years of qualifying reserve service or after 37 days of active service
Silver is awarded for 10 years of qualifying reserve service or after 185 days of active service
Gold is awarded for 15 years of qualifying reserve service or after 370 days of active service

Appearance
It is made of bronze, silver, or gold coloured metal, depending on the grade. The obverse shows a profile of Marianne, the embodiment of the French Republic with the words RÉPUBLIQUE FRANÇAISE around the edge. The reverse bears the inscription RÉSERVISTE VOLONTAIRE DE DÉFENSE ET DE SÉCURITÉ INTÉRIEURE. For silver medals, the ribbon is edged in white. For gold medals, the ribbon is edged in yellow.

Clasps
The medal is awarded with the following clasps:
Garde Nationale, for operational reservists of the military and National police, and those working for the benefit of the reserves.
Réserve citoyenne, for the citizen reservists.
Partenaire de la garde nationale, for those who have promoted engagement and the accomplishment of volunteer reservists mission (on gold medals only).

See also

Ribbons of the French military and civil awards
French Armed Forces

References

External links
 

Military awards and decorations of France